Kelly Meigs (born November 7, 1964) is a Republican member of the Kansas House of Representatives representing the 23rd district. She served in the 17th district from 2011 to 2013, and won her election in the 23rd district in 2012. She received a Bachelor of Science in elementary education from Evangel University in 1987 and has employment experience as a teacher. She and her husband, Mike, have four children. The American Conservative Union gave her a 91% evaluation.

Sources

External links
State Legislature Page
Ballotpedia

Republican Party members of the Kansas House of Representatives
Women state legislators in Kansas
Living people
1964 births
21st-century American women politicians
21st-century American politicians
Evangel University alumni